Veronika Anna Kormos (born 17 August 1992) is a Hungarian racing cyclist, who most recently rode for UCI Women's Continental Team .

Kormos was the winner of the 2014 Hungarian National Time Trial Championships, and also finished 3rd in the 2014 Hungarian National Road Race Championships. She rode at the 2014 UCI Road World Championships, but did not finish the race. She was dropped from the peloton after two laps and had to step out of the race after  together with her teammate Diána Szurominé Pulsfort. She also won the Hungarian National Time Trial Championships in 2015 and 2019.

References

External links

1992 births
Living people
Hungarian female cyclists
Place of birth missing (living people)
University of Pécs alumni